Mayberry is a fictional community that was the setting for The Andy Griffith Show and Mayberry R.F.D.

Mayberry may also refer to:

Places

Communities
Mayberry, Illinois, an unincorporated community in the United States
Mayberry, Maryland, an unincorporated community in the United States
Mayberry, Nebraska, an unincorporated community in the United States
Mayberry, Virginia, located in Patrick County, Virginia, United States
Mayberry Township, Hamilton County, Illinois, United States
Mayberry Township, Montour County, Pennsylvania, United States
Mayberry Village, an urban area in Connecticut, United States

Other places
Mayberry Mall, Mount Airy, North Carolina, United States
Mayberry Middle School, Wichita, Kansas, United States
Mayberry Mound and Village Site, Sims, Illinois, United States
Mayberry Presbyterian Church, Patrick County, Virginia, United States
H. G. W. Mayberry House, Franklin, Tennessee, United States
Henry H. Mayberry House, Franklin, Tennessee, United States

Media and entertainment
Mayberry (Rascal Flatts song), released in 2003
Return to Mayberry, a 1986 television movie
Mayberry R.F.D., television series from 1968 to 1971
Another Mayberry, album by Big Head Todd and the Monsters

People
Mayberry (surname), for a list of people with the name

See also
Mayberry Machiavelli, satirically pejorative phrase coined in 2001
Maesbury